Jason Miller (born c. 1975) is an American communications strategist, political adviser and CEO, best known as the chief spokesman for the Donald Trump 2016 presidential campaign and transition of Donald Trump. He was a Senior Adviser to the Trump 2020 re-election campaign. From 2010 through 2016, Miller was a partner and executive vice-president at Jamestown Associates. He was initially announced as the incoming White House Communications Director during the presidential transition, though he withdrew shortly after amidst news of an extramarital relationship with a staffer who joined the 2016 campaign two months before the election.

In 2017, he became a contributor on CNN, but left the position in 2018 amidst an unsubstantiated third-party allegation about a separate affair, which was denied by both alleged participants under oath in federal court. In March 2021, he became a contributor for Newsmax. Miller left his position as Trump's spokesman in June 2021 to become the CEO of Gettr, a micro-blogging social network with a conservative user base. 

In 2023, Miller left Gettrr to join Trump's 2024 presidential campaign.

Early life
Miller was born and raised in Seattle. His father was a welder, and his mother worked as a bookkeeper and receptionist. Miller graduated from George Washington University, where he majored in political science, in 1997.

Career

Politics 
His first job in politics, from 1994 through 1997, was as a staff assistant to U.S. Senator Slade Gorton of Washington.

After graduating from college, Miller moved to San Diego, California, where he spent most of the next year as coalitions director for businessman Darrell Issa who unsuccessfully sought the U.S. Senate nomination in the 1998 primary. Miller returned to the state in late-1999 to serve as Issa's political director in his successful 2000 campaign for California's 48th congressional district.

In late 2000, Miller became campaign manager for Ric Keller, who won an open seat in the House of Representatives representing Florida with 50.8% of the vote. Miller went on to serve as Keller's chief of staff and to lead his successful re-election effort in 2002. Keller won with 65% of the vote.

From July 2003 to July 2004, Miller managed Jack Ryan's campaign for U.S. Senate in Illinois. Under Miller's leadership, Ryan's campaign succeeded in winning a sharply contested race for the GOP nomination. Ryan's Democratic opponent was Barack Obama, then a state senator. However, Ryan chose to end his candidacy abruptly after a judge in California ordered the unsealing of the Republican candidate's custody file, over the objections of both parents, creating a public furor. Ryan was replaced as nominee by Maryland resident Alan Keyes, and Obama coasted to an easy election that November.

Miller then moved to Florida, where he served as political and communications consultant for the successful primary campaign of Mel Martínez for U.S. Senate, against several well-known contenders. He closed out 2004 doing press and voter-contact consulting in Tom Coburn's winning effort for the Senate from Oklahoma.

In January 2005, Miller was hired to manage the re-election campaign of Virginia Senator George F. Allen, widely tapped as a leading contender for the 2008 Republican presidential nomination. In an amicable parting designed to help Allen's long-term national ambitions, Miller left Allen's re-election in November 2005 to helm the re-election effort of South Carolina Gov. Mark Sanford. Allen's presidential hopes were dashed afterwards, losing a close contest after several major gaffes, while Sanford cruised to a 55% re-election. After the campaign, Miller took a job with the State of South Carolina, doing strategic planning for the governor, also serving as Deputy Chief of Staff.

National politics beckoned in April 2007, when Miller moved to New York and joined the Rudy Giuliani 2008 presidential campaign as Deputy Communications Director. Giuliani ended his campaign prior to Super Tuesday, after finishing third behind eventual nominee John McCain in the Florida primary.

In 2008, Miller joined Denzenhall Associates, a D.C.-based public relations firm specializing in crisis communications, advising major corporations, trade associations, and prominent individuals.

Jamestown Associates
Miller joined the New Jersey-based Jamestown Associates consulting firm in January 2010 as Partner and Executive Vice President, working closely on campaigns with Jamestown CEO Larry Weitzner.

Beginning in 2012 and continuing through 2016, Miller and Jamestown took on several insurgent candidates challenging Republican incumbents. These included Mourdock, in Indiana (who defeated longtime Sen. Richard Lugar in the 2012 primary, losing to Democrat Joe Donnelly in the fall;) and radiologist Milton R. Wolf, who nearly upset Kansas Sen. Pat Roberts in the August 2014 primary. They did work for the Club for Growth PAC, which used Jamestown to help challenge a GOP incumbent in Mississippi and nominate a Tea Party conservative in Nebraska. And in early 2015, they also worked on Ted Cruz's presidential campaign.

In 2013, Miller returned to South Carolina as ad producer and strategist for Mark Sanford's comeback campaign for U.S. House, following the former Governor's scandalous affair with an Argentinian journalist and subsequent divorce. Despite being actively shunned by national party committees and major donors, Sanford won the GOP nomination with 56.5%, and then captured the coastal 1st District seat with 54% in the May special election. Of Miller, Sanford chief of staff Scott English said, "He's disciplined in the middle of a firefight. He's good at thinking about, 'What are we talking about? What are we trying to accomplish?' and then going back on message again... A lot of people come into a safe environment, where they already know the outcome. He takes on challenges."

In 2015, Miller and Jamestown Associates were the principal consultants for media and communications for Matt Bevin in Kentucky. Bevin, who had lost his challenge to Senate Majority Leader Mitch McConnell a year earlier, was the surprise winner of a three-way race for the gubernatorial nomination in May—a victory attributed in part to a closing ad by Miller and Jamestown, "Food Fight." After a difficult campaign he was behind in most polls; Bevin then won a 53% to 44% victory against attorney general Jack Conway that November.

2016 presidential campaign and transition
During the Bevin campaign and thereafter into early 2016, Miller was Texas Senator Ted Cruz's "digital and communications adviser" in his campaign for the Republican presidential nomination. The Washington Post'''s Katie Zezima wrote that Miller's challenge was "crafting Cruz's message of unyielding conservatism and spreading it among grassroots groups, where the senator hopes to gain the most support”. Cruz suspended his campaign on May 5, following his defeat in the Indiana primary.

Miller’s relationship with Donald Trump dated from before the 2016 campaign. In 2011, when Trump was mulling a 2012 campaign, Miller was slated to serve as campaign manager. On June 29, 2016, the Trump campaign announced hiring Miller as senior communications adviser. BloombergPolitics described it as an attempt to "professionalize" the Trump communications operation. After the announcement, some reporters noted the many anti-Trump Tweets Miller had sent prior to the end of Cruz's campaign.

After the election, Miller was part of the Trump transition team, serving as its chief spokesman from November 2016 to January 2017. On December 22, he was announced as the President's choice for White House Communications Director. However, two days later, Miller declined the offer, stating: "After spending this past week with my family, the most amount of time I have been able to spend with them since March 2015, it is clear they need to be my top priority right now and this is not the right time to start a new job as demanding as White House communications director. My wife and I are also excited about the arrival of our second daughter in January, and I need to put them in front of my career... I look forward to continuing to support the President-elect from the outside after my work on the transition concludes."

His decision came after allegations of an extramarital affair with Trump campaign staffer Arlene J. Delgado. As a result of the affair with Delgado, Miller became the father to a baby boy in July 2017.

After 2016 campaign
In January 2017, Miller sold his interest in Jamestown Associates, and joined Teneo Strategy. Teneo advises "Fortune 500 CEOs on crisis communications, corporate communications and media relations," according to the Axios blog. In the role of Trump adviser, Miller had criticized Teneo as a "corporate consultancy" created by Doug Band "to trade off the influence and power gained through the affiliation with [Hillary Clinton]." Miller continued at Teneo through 2019.

In 2017, he became a CNN political contributor. He was subsequently quit the network due to legal difficulties.

In October 2019, Miller began co-hosting, with Steve Bannon, War Room: Impeachment, a daily radio show and podcast intended to advise the Trump White House and its allies into how to fight the impeachment inquiry against Donald Trump. The podcast was removed from YouTube in January 2021, following the 2021 storming of the United States Capitol.

The Trump 2020 campaign hired Miller as a senior adviser in June 2020. The Trump campaign routed his $35,000 monthly salary through his former firm, making it harder for the mother of Miller's son to prove his income in court, and aiding him in dodging approximately $3,000 per month in child support.

In October 2020, shortly after the FBI announced that it had thwarted an attempt by a right-wing militia group to kidnap Michigan Governor Gretchen Whitmer, Miller said it was "shameful" for Whitmer to call out President Trump's divisive rhetoric. Trump had tweeted, "LIBERATE MICHIGAN!" in April 2020, which was seen as a rallying cry for opponents of Whitmer. Miller said, "If we want to talk about hatred, then Gov. Whitmer, go look in the mirror."

In the days before the 2020 election, Miller claimed in an ABC News interview with George Stephanopoulos that he believed that Trump would secure a sure win with at least 290 electoral votes on election night. Spencer Cox, then-Lieutenant Governor of Utah, stated on Twitter that people should "ignore this type of garbage," referring to Miller's remarks. Cox's additional remarks in response to Miller, in which he stated, "elections are never decided on election night," did not acknowledge the predictions Miller had cited in the ABC News interview that Trump would secure "280" or "over 290" electoral votes (i.e., over the necessary 270 votes to be declared winner) on election night. In his exchange with Stephanopoulos, Miller did not dispute or even address the use of mail-in ballots, and he did not claim that vote counts were typically finalized or certified on election night.

 Newsmax 
On March 18, 2021, it was announced that Miller had joined Newsmax as a contributor.

 Gettr 

In June 2021, it was reported that Miller had left the Trump team to become CEO of a tech company.  Miller was replaced by Liz Harrington.  On July 1, 2021, he launched a beta version of the social network Gettr, which is targeted at conservatives and which Miller has described as a "place people won't be canceled". In the first week, Gettr attracted more than 1.4 million users. Miller stated in a Fox Business Interview, he said "prominent Republicans like former Secretary of State Mike Pompeo, House Minority Leader Kevin McCarthy, House GOP Conference Chair Elise Stefanik, former Secretary of Housing and Urban Development Ben Carson and more have joined the platform, along with other popular conservative voices like Charlie Kirk, Monica Crowley, Rogan O’Handley and more."

 2024 presidential campaign 
In February 2023, Miller left his role as CEO of Gettr in order to work as senior adviser for Donald Trump's 2024 presidential campaign.

 Personal life 
Miller met his wife, Kelly, while working for a congressional campaign in California. They live in suburban Washington, D.C. and have two daughters.

He also fathered a child with A. J. Delgado during a two-month extra-marital affair, born six months after his second child.

Controversies and scandals

Delgado suits, 2018–2019
On September 14, 2018, A. J. Delgado, the mother of Miller's son, filed a suit in a Miami-Dade, Florida, Circuit Court.

Ultimately, the court ordered Miller to pay Delgado thousands of dollars for child support. Miller had said he was working hard to become a "better husband and father" and took his parental obligations "very seriously", and that Ms. Delgado had "turned a simple paternity proceeding into all-out war".

Miller and an unnamed Doe denied all parts of an accusation made by Delgado in her 2018 suit in which Delgado claimed that Miller had drugged Doe with an abortifacient drug, by blending a pill into a fruit smoothie.  The ensuing controversy caused him to leave his position as a political commentator on CNN. In the suit, Delgado requested that Miller undergo a psychological evaluation, because she alleged that she was told the story by a Republican lobbyist, and she further alleged that journalist Yashar Ali confirmed the story. Miller questioned the propriety of publishing that unverified claim (from what was then a sealed Florida court filing and was denied by the alleged mistress), causing damage to his reputation. He sued Gizmodo Media Group and Splinter News reporter Katherine Krueger (author of the article) for $100 million for its reporting of the allegation. Chapo Trap House co-host Will Menaker was added as a defendant in the lawsuit after Menaker labeled Miller a "baby killer" in a Twitter post.

The US District Court in New York dismissed Miller's suit, ruling that the "fair report" doctrine (which bars civil actions arising from a "fair and true report of a judicial proceeding''") protected Gizmodo from liability for defamation, as the article accurately reported the allegation Delgado had included in the Florida filing. In its ruling, the New York court stated that the Gizmodo article had "essentially summarize[d] or restate[d] the allegations" made by Delgado; by granting summary judgement to Gizmodo (necessarily occurring before the fact-finding stage in U.S. civil litigation), the New York court did not and could not rule on the accuracy of the Florida allegation itself.

Miller later brought another suit in Florida, which ended in August 2019 when the court granted Gizmodo's motion for summary judgment, as had occurred in the New York case. The Florida court applied similar reasoning as the New York court had applied (i.e., the "fair report" privilege enjoyed by publications citing a judicial proceeding) to the claims brought against the publication and author. In its opinion granting Gizmodo's motion, the Florida court opined that Gizmodo and Krueger (whose article made reference to Delgado's third-party allegations, which were denied by Miller and Doe) had disclosed the "potential biases" involved in those allegations, explaining, "by disclosing this information, Defendants [Gizmodo and Krueger] invite readers to decide for themselves" whether the third-party allegations were credible. The Florida court also found that declarations made by Krueger and her editors at Gizmodo suggested that "neither Krueger nor her editors intended to augment the credibility of the accusations...by attributing them to Jane Doe herself." In May 2021, nearly two years after the case ended, the Florida court approved Gizmodo's request for Miller to pay $42,000 in legal fees incurred by Gizmodo while defending the case.

Neither courts' granting of the defendants' motions for summary judgement, which precluded fact-finding by the courts with respect to the underlying disputed third-party allegations against Miller, addressed whether he had actually done what Delgado alleged. In their answers before the Florida court, both Miller and alleged previous mistress Doe denied under oath that they had ever had a sexual relationship. Both testified that Doe had never become pregnant with his child, that Miller had never been to Doe's apartment, and denied that he had given her a smoothie — the drink that allegedly contained the pill. Doe specifically denied that she had ever "lost a pregnancy" as a result of a beverage given to her by him.

Detention in Brazil
In September 2021, Miller and other American right-wing media personalities in his traveling party were detained and questioned for three hours at the international airport in Brasília, Brazil, before returning to the U.S. following participation in a CPAC Brasil Conference. The investigation was part of an inquiry by Brazilian Supreme Court Justice Alexandre de Moraes into misinformation allegedly perpetuated by the administration of President Jair Bolsonaro. Miller noted that Brazil was the second-largest market for Gettr, and praised Bolsonaro's supporters as "proud patriots". Miller later said that Brazilian officials had not accused him of any wrongdoing. Miller continued to advise Jair Bolsonaro after his October 2022 election defeat, meeting with the president's son, Eduardo Bolsonaro, in November 2022, as protests and election challenges continued.

Testimony before January 6 Committee
During the third public hearing on the investigation of the January 6, 2021 attack on the US Capitol, Miller appeared via a taped deposition. He stated that on January 5, 2021, he helped Donald Trump craft a statement in response to a New York Times story that said Pence disagreed with Trump’s claims that Pence had the authority to change the results of the election. In the statement, Trump claimed that he and Vice President Mike Pence were in agreement, while in fact Pence had made clear multiple times that he disagreed strongly with Trump on this issue.

Marc Short, Pence’s Chief of Staff, expressed his displeasure that Miller had allowed such a statement to be released without consulting Pence.

See also
Timeline of Russian interference in the 2016 United States elections
Timeline of Russian interference in the 2016 United States elections (July 2016–election day)
Timeline of post-election transition following Russian interference in the 2016 United States elections

References

American political consultants
American public relations people
Donald Trump 2016 presidential campaign
Living people
Year of birth uncertain
People from Seattle
George Washington University alumni
Year of birth missing (living people)